The 1997 Nebelhorn Trophy took place between August 26 and 29, 1997. It is an international senior-level figure skating competition organized by the Deutsche Eislauf-Union and held annually in Oberstdorf, Germany. The competition is named after the Nebelhorn, a nearby mountain.

It was one of the first international senior competitions of the season. Skaters were entered by their respective national federations, rather than receiving individual invitations as in the Grand Prix of Figure Skating, and competed in four disciplines: men's singles, ladies' singles, pair skating, and ice dance. The Fritz-Geiger-Memorial Trophy was presented to the country with the highest placements across all disciplines.

Results

Men

Ladies

Pairs

Ice dance

External links
 1997 Nebelhorn Trophy

Nebelhorn Trophy
Nebelhorn Trophy, 1997
1997 in German sport